Bekeshevo (Bikeş) is a rural locality (a selo) and the administrative centre of Bekeshevsky Selsoviet, Baymaksky District, Bashkortostan, Russia. The population was 711 as of 2010. There are 10 streets.

Geography 
Bekeshevo is located 25 km northwest of Baymak (the district's administrative centre) by road. Verkhnetavlykayevo is the nearest rural locality.

References 

Rural localities in Baymaksky District